The 1997–98 season was Sheffield Wednesday F.C.'s 131st season. They competed in the twenty-team Premiership, the top tier of English football, finishing sixteenth.

Season summary
Having narrowly missed out on a UEFA Cup place in 1996–97, the club record £5.7 million signing of Italian striker Paolo Di Canio from Celtic gave Owls fans hopes of another challenge for Europe. But it was not to be, and by the time they lost 6–1 to Manchester United in November, relegation was looking a real possibility. Manager David Pleat was swiftly sacked, and Ron Atkinson – manager of the 1991 promotion and League Cup winning side – returned to the manager's seat on a short-term contract. He achieved safety by a margin of four points, in 16th place on 44 points by virtue of goal difference (three other sides had finished on 44 points), and was disappointed on being told that his contract would not be renewed. He was succeeded by Danny Wilson, a former Owls player who played for them in the early, more successful part of the decade.

Final league table

Results summary

Results by round

Results
Sheffield Wednesday's score comes first

Legend

FA Premier League

FA Cup

League Cup

Players

First-team squad
Squad at end of season

Left club during season

Reserve squad

Transfers

In

Out

Transfers in:  £11,720,000
Transfers out:  £5,900,000
Total spending:  £5,820,000

Statistics

Starting 11
Considering starts in all competitions
 GK: #1,  Kevin Pressman, 41
 RB: #2,  Peter Atherton, 31
 CB: #5,  Jon Newsome, 29
 CB: #6,  Des Walker, 43
 LB: #3,  Ian Nolan, 32
 CM: #25,  Petter Rudi, 22
 CM: #24,  Jim Magilton, 16 (#7,  Guy Whittingham, and #18,  Dejan Stefanović, both have 20 starts)
 CM: #4,  Mark Pembridge, 36
 AM: #8,  Benito Carbone, 31
 CF: #10,  Andy Booth, 23
 CF: #11,  Paolo Di Canio, 39

Notes

References

 
 
 

1997-98
Shef